The America Zone was one of the two regional zones of the 1949 Davis Cup.

4 teams entered the America Zone, with the winner going on to compete in the Inter-Zonal Final against the winner of the Europe Zone. Australia defeated Mexico in the final, and went on to face Italy in the Inter-Zonal Final.

Draw

Semifinals

Canada vs. Australia

Cuba vs. Mexico

Final

Australia vs. Mexico

References

External links
Davis Cup official website

Davis Cup Americas Zone
America Zone
Davis Cup